"Taste It" is a song by British singer songwriter Jake Bugg. It was released as the fourth single from his debut studio album Jake Bugg (2012). The song is also the title track of a four track EP. It was released as a digital download in the United Kingdom on 13 July 2012.

Music video
A music video to accompany the release of "Taste It" was first released onto YouTube on 9 July 2012 at a total length of two minutes and twenty-seven seconds.

Track listings

Chart performance

Release history

References

2012 songs
Jake Bugg songs
Songs written by Iain Archer
2012 singles
Songs written by Jake Bugg
Mercury Records singles